Earn Albert "Ernie" Herbert (January 30, 1887 – January 13, 1968), nicknamed "Tex", was a Major League Baseball pitcher who played for the Cincinnati Reds in  and the St. Louis Terriers in  and . He holds the major league career record for most innings pitched (115.2) without a loss.

References

External links

1887 births
1968 deaths
Cincinnati Reds players
St. Louis Terriers
Major League Baseball pitchers
Baseball players from Missouri
Austin Senators players
Waco Navigators players
Shreveport Pirates (baseball) players
Montgomery Rebels players
Portsmouth Pirates players
Nashville Vols players
Chattanooga Lookouts players
San Antonio Bears players
Alexandria White Sox players